Tiflorex, formerly known as flutiorex, is a stimulant amphetamine. Its most pronounced effect is in suppression of appetite; it has little effect on pulse rate, sleep, or mood. It was found to be twice as potent an anorectic as fenfluramine.

SL 72.340-d was cited to be 4x the anorectant potency of fenfluramine (ED50=1.4 mg/kg vs 5.6 mg/kg).

Synthesis

The Rosenmund reduction of 3-(trifluoromethylthio)benzoyl chloride [51748-28-8] (1) gave 3-((trifluoromethyl)thio)benzaldehyde [51748-27-7] (2). Henry reaction with nitroethane led to 1-(2-nitroprop-1-en-1-yl)-3-[(trifluoromethyl)sulfanyl]benzene [176242-84-5] (3). With the aid of iron catalyst in concentrated HCl acid there occurred FGI into 1-(3'-trifluoromethylthiophenyl)-2-propanone, CID:21325269 (4'). Reductive amination with ethylamine and formic acid as the reductant completed the synthesis of tiflorex (5).

References 

Anorectics
Trifluoromethyl compounds
Substituted amphetamines
Thioethers